Richard S. Williams was an American merchant, banker and politician from New York.

Life
He was a member of the New York State Assembly (New York Co.) in 1844.

He was a Governor of the Alms House of New York City from 1849 to 1853.

He was a member of the New York State Senate (3rd D.) in 1850 and 1851.

He was President of the Market Bank of New York City.

Sources
The New York Civil List compiled by Franklin Benjamin Hough (pages 136, 147, 229 and 316; Weed, Parsons and Co., 1858)
Laws of the State of New York (1849; pg. 367; "AN ACT to provide for the government of the department of Alms and Penitentiary, in the city and county of New-York.")
The Literary World (issue of October 22, 1853; pg. 206)
THE MARKET BANK DEFALCATION in NYT on February 13, 1855

Year of birth missing
Year of death missing
New York (state) state senators
New York (state) Whigs
19th-century American politicians
Politicians from New York City
Members of the New York State Assembly
American bankers